The Austin Public Library is a public library in Austin, Minnesota. It is a member of Southeastern Libraries Cooperating, the SE Minnesota library region.

History

The library began in 1884 out of the basement of the Mower County courthouse. By the turn of the century there became an increased need in more library space so the city of Austin reached out to Andrew Carnegie to petition for funds for a new building. An initial request for $25,000 was turned down and replaced with an offer of $12,000. Citing a growth in population the city requested more, and on October 3, 1901, Carnegie agreed to donate $15,000 with the stipulation the city agree to pay a $1,500 annual upkeep and maintenance fee on the building. Upon its completion the Austin Ladies' Floral Club donated 3,425 of the volumes in its own library to the new Carnegie library.

The Carnegie building was the main public library of Austin until its replacement in 1996.

References

External links
Austin Public Library
Online Catalog

Public libraries in Minnesota
Education in Mower County, Minnesota
Southeastern Libraries Cooperating
Buildings and structures in Austin, Minnesota